Alex Kristopher Oikkonen (born 15 October 1994) is a Puerto Rican international footballer who plays as a midfielder for OTP.

Early and personal life
Oikkonen was born in Joutseno, Finland. His father is Finnish and his mother is Puerto Rican.

Club career
Oikkonen has played club football in Puerto Rico, Spain and Finland for Bayamón, Martos, MYPA and Kultsu.

International career
He made his senior international debut for Puerto Rico in 2011, and has appeared in FIFA World Cup qualifying matches.

International goals
Scores and results list Puerto Rico's goal tally first.

References

1994 births
Living people
Puerto Rican footballers
Puerto Rico international footballers
Bayamón FC players
Martos CD footballers
Kultsu FC players
Myllykosken Pallo −47 players
Veikkausliiga players
Kakkonen players
Association football midfielders
Puerto Rican expatriate footballers
Puerto Rican expatriate sportspeople in Spain
Puerto Rican expatriate sportspeople in Australia
Finnish expatriate sportspeople in Spain
Finnish expatriate footballers
Finnish expatriate sportspeople in Australia
Expatriate soccer players in Australia
Finnish people of Puerto Rican descent
Puerto Rican people of Finnish descent
AC Kajaani players
PEPO Lappeenranta players
Oulun Työväen Palloilijat players
Finnish footballers
Sportspeople from South Karelia